"Tomorrow (Give in to the Night)" is a song by Belgian electronic DJ duo Dimitri Vegas & Like Mike, Swedish DJ duo Dada Life and English/Irish singer-songwriter Tara McDonald. The song reached number 5 in the Belgian dance charts and 16 in the commercial charts making it the biggest selling anthem for Tomorrowland to date.

Background and composition
"Tomorrow" the instrumental was written by Dimitri Vegas & Like Mike and Dada Life. Dimitri Vegas & Like Mike approached Tara McDonald to write and record the song and to feature as the vocalist on the record. McDonald wrote the song and recorded her vocals at her "Love Star" studios. The song was written as the official anthem for the award-winning dance festival Tomorrowland for 2010.

Live performances
In 2010 Tomorrowland sold out days before the event, with a record attendance of 120,000 visitors over two days. Dimitri Vegas & Like Mike, Dada Life and Tara McDonald performed the official anthem "Tomorrow (Give in to the Night)" song twice on the main stage at the festival after Swedish House Mafia.

Music video
The official music video premiered on YouTube on 8 September 2010. The video was shot during the live performance at the Tomorrowland. Showing Dimitri Vegas & Like Mike and Dada Life at the dj console and Tara McDonald during a live PA on the MainStage during  the day and night.

Track listing

Charts

Notes

References

2010 singles
Tara McDonald songs
2010 songs
Spinnin' Records singles
Songs written by Tara McDonald
Dimitri Vegas & Like Mike songs